The Okeechobee hurricane of 1928, also known as the San Felipe Segundo hurricane, was one of the deadliest hurricanes in the recorded history of the North Atlantic basin, and the fourth deadliest hurricane in the United States, only behind the 1900 Galveston hurricane, 1899 San Ciriaco hurricane, and Hurricane Maria. The hurricane killed an estimated 2,500 people in the United States; most of the fatalities occurred in the state of Florida, particularly in Lake Okeechobee. It was the fourth tropical cyclone, third hurricane, and only major hurricane of the 1928 Atlantic hurricane season. It developed off the west coast of Africa on September 6 as a tropical depression, but it strengthened into a tropical storm later that day, shortly before passing south of the Cape Verde islands. Further intensification was slow and halted late on September 7. About 48 hours later, the storm strengthened and became a Category 1 hurricane on the Saffir–Simpson hurricane wind scale. Still moving westward, the system reached Category 4 intensity before striking Guadeloupe on September 12, where it brought great destruction and resulted in 1,200 deaths. The islands of Martinique, Montserrat, and Nevis also reported damage and fatalities, but not nearly as severe as in Guadeloupe.

About six hours later, the system made landfall in Puerto Rico; it remains the only tropical cyclone on record to strike the island at Category 5 intensity. Very strong winds resulted in severe damage in Puerto Rico; 24,728 homes were destroyed and 192,444 were damaged throughout the island, leaving over 500,000 people homeless. Heavy rainfall also led to extreme damage to vegetation and agriculture. On Puerto Rico alone, there were 312 deaths and about US$50 million ($ million today) in damage. While crossing the island and emerging into the Atlantic, the storm weakened slightly, falling to Category 4 intensity. It began crossing through the Bahamas on September 16, where it resulted in 18 fatalities.

In the city, more than 1,711 homes were destroyed; the effects were most severe around Lake Okeechobee. Numerous houses and buildings were swept away in the cities of Belle Glade, Canal Point, Chosen, Pahokee, and South Bay, Florida. At least 2,500 people drowned, while damage was estimated at $25 million. The system weakened significantly while crossing Florida, falling to Category 1 intensity late on September 17. Early on the following day, the system weakened to a tropical storm and became an extratropical cyclone over North Carolina hours later. Overall, the hurricane caused $100 million in damage and killed at least 4,112 people.

Meteorological history 

On September 6, ships reported a tropical depression developing just off the west coast of Africa near Dakar, Senegal. However, lack of observations for several days prevented the system from being classified in real time as it moved generally westward across the Atlantic Ocean. Later that day, two other ships confirmed the intensity of the storm, and the Hurricane Research Division estimated it strengthened into a hurricane at 18:00 UTC on September 10.

As the storm neared the Lesser Antilles, it continued to intensify. On September 13, the  eye crossed Puerto Rico in eight hours from the southeast to the northwest, moving ashore near Guayama and exiting between Aguadilla and Isabela. On this basis, the hurricane is believed to have made landfall in Puerto Rico as a Category 5 hurricane on the Saffir-Simpson scale, although there was uncertainty in the peak intensity, due to the large size and slow movement of the storm.

The storm brushed the northern coast of Hispaniola while moving west-northwestward, gradually restrengthening. The storm continued through the Bahamas as a strong Category 4 hurricane, passing near Nassau at 10:00 UTC on September 16. Initially, Richard Gray of the U.S. Weather Bureau was optimistic that the storm would spare South Florida. Peak gusts were estimated near  at Canal Point.

The hurricane quickly weakened as it progressed inland and moved over Lake Okeechobee, although its large size enabled it to maintain hurricane status for several more days. At 08:00 UTC on September 18, the storm again reached open waters. Accelerating northeastward, the system quickly weakened into a tropical storm over North Carolina. On September 19, the storm transitioned into an extratropical cyclone, although it restrengthened slightly to hurricane strength, due to baroclinic forcing caused by a frontal system. The cyclone turned to the north-northwest, moving quickly through the eastern United States. On September 21, the former hurricane dissipated over Ontario, having merged with another disturbance.

Effects

Leeward Islands 

The hurricane moved directly over the Leeward Islands in the Caribbean Sea, strengthening as it did so. In Martinique, further south of the storm's path, there were three fatalities. Guadeloupe received a direct hit from the storm, apparently with little warning; the death toll there was 1,200, and damage reports relayed through Paris indicated "great destruction" on the island. About three-fourths of the island's residents were left homeless. In the community of Saint-François, the only structure to remain standing was the police station, which was built with reinforced concrete. To the east of the town, the merchant ship Albatros sank; it had been carrying 80 casks of rum. The crew and the five men attempting to save the ship drowned. Approximately 85%–95% of banana crops were destroyed, 70%–80% of tree crops suffered severe damage, and 40% of the sugar cane crop was ruined. The people struggled to survive both in the short and longer term after the storm.

Montserrat, just north of the storm's center, was warned in advance of the storm but still suffered £150,000 (1928 UKP) in damages and 42 deaths; Plymouth and Salem were devastated, and crop losses caused near-starvation conditions before relief could arrive. All commercial and government buildings on the island were destroyed, as were more than 600 homes. Saint Kitts and Nevis also suffered heavily. On the island of St. Kitts, a number of homes built on wooden foundations were demolished. Nine deaths were reported, six of which occurred in a schoolhouse collapse. Thirteen people were killed on the island of Nevis.

The storm destroyed hundreds of homes on Antigua, including a doctor's home and a "poor house". Government offices, hospitals, and school were also damaged. On Saint Croix, nearly all of the island's 11,000 residents suffered some degree of loss. A total of 143 buildings were destroyed, including a sugar mill. The storm resulted in nine deaths on the island. Throughout the Virgin Islands, as many as 700,000 people were rendered homeless.

Puerto Rico 

While the storm was passing near Dominica, the U.S. Weather Bureau located at San Juan, Puerto Rico, warned about the threat of the hurricane which would strike the island within a day or two. The advisory was sent via telegraph to 75 police districts and was broadcast from the naval radio station every two hours; this was the first hurricane warning broadcast by radio. Warnings were also posted for 12 ports along the southern coast, causing ships to avoid the island or remain at port. Effective preparation is credited for the relatively low death toll of 312, and not a single ship was lost at sea in the vicinity of Puerto Rico. By comparison, the weaker 1899 San Ciriaco hurricane killed approximately 3,000 people.

According to the San Juan National Weather Service office, the storm was "up to this time the greatest and more  intense and destructive hurricane of record in Puerto Rico." Along the storm path, the eye passed over Guayama, Cayey, and Aibonito, resulting in a period of calm lasting 20 minutes. The island of Puerto Rico received the worst of the storm's winds when the hurricane moved directly across the island at Category 5 strength. The hurricane was extremely large as it crossed Puerto Rico.

The rainfall recorded on September 13–14, 1928, remains the record for the maximum rainfall associated with a hurricane in Puerto Rico within a period of forty-eight hours. The anemometer located in Puerta de Tierra lost one of its cups at 11:44 am on September 13, just when it had registered a maximum speed of  —a speed that was sustained for five consecutive minutes. Previously the same instrument had measured  for one minute. Because these measurements were taken  from San Felipe's eye, at the time, it seemed possible that some estimates of  near the center of the storm were not overdrawn.

There was general destruction through the island, with the towns where the eye passed being swept away. Property damage on the island from winds and rain was catastrophic. The northeast portion of the island received winds in excess of Category 3 strength, with hurricane-force winds lasting as long as 18 hours. Official reports stated "several hundred thousand" people were left homeless, and property damages were estimated at $50 million.

On the island there was no building that was not affected. Some sugar mills ("Centrales") that had cost millions of dollars to build were reduced to rubble. Reports say that 24,728 homes were destroyed and 192,444 were partially destroyed.  Most of the sugarcane fields were flooded, ruining the year's crops. Half of the coffee plants and half of the shade trees that covered these were destroyed; almost all of the coffee harvest was lost. The coffee industry would take years to recover since coffee needs shade trees to grow. The tobacco farms also had great losses. After this hurricane, Puerto Rico never regained its position as a major coffee exporter.

Communications were disrupted by fallen trees, landslides, and damaged bridges. Some 770 school buildings were destroyed or damaged. According to some estimates of the day, excluding personal losses, the damages reached $85.312 million and more than 500,000 people were left homeless. Until Hurricane Maria 89 years later, San Felipe II was officially classified as Puerto Rico's biggest, worst, and most devastating hurricane to ever have hit the island.

Greater Antilles and Bahamas 

After affecting Puerto Rico, the hurricane passed just north of the Dominican Republic, causing very little damage. This was due to the small core and weaker winds to the south of the center. Advance warning reduced the number of ships traversing the region.

According to a ship report in the region, "The force of the wind ... could only be judged by the noise made by the storm, which reminded me of the New York subway going full speed passing switches." Winds approached  at Nassau before the anemometer failed. In addition to the winds, the storm dropped heavy rainfall in the region, totaling  in Nassau. As in Puerto Rico, authorities in the Bahamas had ample warning of the hurricane's approach, and preparations minimized the loss of life in the islands. Two boats were wrecked as they washed ashore in Grand Turk, although the crews were saved. A sloop traversing from Ambergris Cay to Grand Turk was lost, killing all 18 people on board. The storm caused heavy damage throughout the Bahamas, mostly to property and crops.

In Nassau, some buildings which had been recently repaired after the 1926 Nassau hurricane were destroyed during this storm. A 10-year-old girl drowned after falling into an open trench filled with water. At the Fort Montague Hotel, the windows, doors, and furniture were badly damaged. Similar damage was reported at the Royal Victoria Hotel, while the British Colonial Hotel was largely spared. However, the gardens of the three hotels were "damaged almost beyond recognition".

Ninety-five houses and some other buildings, including a few churches and government buildings, were damaged or destroyed on Eleuthera. Minor damage was reported on Rum Cay. Most of the food crops were destroyed. On San Salvador Island, four buildings were demolished, including two churches, while several other structures suffered minor damage. Food crops were nearly wiped out.

Florida

While the hurricane was moving through the Bahamas, the Weather Bureau issued storm warnings from Miami to Titusville, later upgrading to a hurricane warning from Miami to Daytona Beach. The agency advised residents to take precautions for the hurricane, citing the potential for strong winds and waves. Hurricane warnings were also posted for the west coast from Punta Rassa to Apalachicola, and after the storm recurved, hurricane warnings were extended along the east coast to Jacksonville. Because of well-issued hurricane warnings, residents were prepared for the storm, and only 26 deaths were recorded in the coastal Palm Beach area.

The hurricane left thousands of people homeless in Florida; property damage was estimated at $25 million ($). It is estimated if a similar storm were to strike as of the year 2003, it would cause $18.7 billion in damages. The cyclone remains one of three Atlantic hurricanes to strike the southern mainland of Florida with a central pressure below , the others being the 1926 Miami hurricane and Hurricane Andrew of 1992.

In addition to the human fatalities, 1,278 livestock and 47,389 poultry were killed, respectively. Agriculture was significantly affected, with the storm destroying what may have been the largest "citrus crop in the history of the industry". Approximately 6% of oranges and 18% of grapefruit were ruined, respectively. Harvesting the remaining crops was delayed until mid-October due to inundated groves. Communications also suffered severely. Throughout the state, 32,000 households were left without telephone service and 400 poles were broken and about 2,500 others leaning. Governor of Florida John W. Martin estimated that 15,000 families were left homeless in Palm Beach County alone. Additionally, about 11,500 families would need to be "re-established".

Coastal South Florida

In Miami, damage was minimal, limited to broken windows and awnings. In Hollywood and Fort Lauderdale, windows and roofs were damaged, although to a fairly minor extent. Numerous power lines and telephone wires were downed in the latter city. Northward, from Pompano Beach to Jupiter, buildings suffered serious damage from the heavy winds and  storm surge. Nearly all small frame houses were destroyed in Deerfield Beach, while several citizens estimated that at least 50% of homes were demolished. The town's post office, depot, and an entire business block were also destroyed. An eight-year-old boy drowned in a ditch near where his family sought refuge. In Boca Raton, two garages and several houses were destroyed. At the Cloister Inn, windows were shattered and the roof was damaged; across the street, 32 freight cars belonging to a train along the Florida East Coast Railway were tossed by the wind into a nearby ditch. A short distance to the north, a warehouse was flattened. A building occupied by a restaurant and a store was flattened. In Delray Beach, four churches suffered severe damage and the Alta Repp and Seacrest hotels both lost a portion of their roof. The police reported three deaths within the city. In Delray Beach and Lantana, all houses and the railroad station were badly damaged. In Boynton Beach, about 75% of businesses suffered complete destruction. Fifteen people were injured by a roof collapse while taking refuge in the auditorium of a high school.

In Lake Worth, approximately 50% of homes were damaged or destroyed, while 75% of buildings in the business district suffered damage. Damage along the coast was most severe in Palm Beach. Total coastal damages were estimated as "several million" dollars. In West Palm Beach, the storm destroyed 1,711 homes and damaged 6,369 others, and demolished 268 businesses and impacted 490 other businesses; the city suffered the worst damage, totaling just under $13.8 million. Likewise, there was also severe wind damage in Palm Beach. A few buildings constructed by Henry Flagler, such as The Breakers, the Royal Poinciana Hotel, and Whitehall, were damaged. Mar-a-Lago suffered few effects other than uprooted trees and the destruction of a large Roman-style window, according to Marjorie Merriweather Post. Rodman Wanamaker's house, known as "La Guerida" and later the "Winter White House" when used by President John F. Kennedy, suffered heavy damage during the storm. The Alba, Billows, New Palm Beach, and Royal Daneli hotels all suffered water damage, while the Alba Hotel was also deroofed. Nearby, the Rainbow Pier had only structural damage to its railings, though the pier office was blown away. Approximately 600 structures, including 10 hotels, were damaged in Palm Beach. Damage totaled over $2 million.

The strongest winds in the eyewall affected northern Palm Beach County, particularly the vicinity of Jupiter as the eye made landfall farther south. The lighthouse keeper, Captain Seabrook, and his son, Franklin, worked to keep the light on during the storm after the electricity went out. After the generator failed to work, they hand-cranked the light's mantle. The building formerly used as a Weather Bureau Office was destroyed. Nearby, six people died after a house was demolished. Six other fatalities occurred west of Jupiter after a school where people sought shelter collapsed.

Lake Okeechobee and Everglades
Inland, the hurricane wreaked much more widespread destruction along the more heavily populated coast of Lake Okeechobee. Residents had been warned to evacuate the low ground earlier in the day, but after the hurricane did not arrive on schedule, many thought it had missed and returned to their homes. In the weeks prior to the storm, heavy rainfall had caused the lake to rise  between August 10 and September 10 and filled nearby canals and ditches. Precipitation from the hurricane itself caused Lake Okeechobee to rise further. When the worst of the storm crossed the lake, the south-blowing wind caused a storm surge to overflow the small dike that had been built at the south end of the lake. Houses were floated off their foundations and dashed to pieces against any obstacles encountered. Most survivors and bodies were washed out into the Everglades, where many of the bodies were never found. Agricultural losses in the area surrounding Lake Okeechobee were also significant, with virtually all crops destroyed and over 150 tractors suffering damage.

As the rear eyewall passed over the area, the flood reversed itself, breaking the dikes along the northern coast of the lake and causing similar but smaller flooding. In Okeechobee County, homes along the lake were destroyed by the storm surge, while dwellings within the city of Okeechobee were severely damaged or demolished by winds of at least . However, brick and concrete dwellings suffered little damage. A number of three-story business buildings collapsed during the storm. Almost all roads were left impassable, while communications were nearly wiped out. Overall, 27 deaths occurred in Okeechobee County. Along the southwestern shore of Lake Okeechobee, the towns of Clewiston and Moore Haven were both flooded, but most houses suffered more damage due to strong winds.

On Kreamer Island, many residents received information about the storm when it was too late to evacuate. In some houses, 20–30 people sought shelter inside and later stood on tables and chairs to remain above the water. Despite this, only one person drowned on the island. Residents of Torry Island did not have enough time to prepare for the storm. They tried to evacuate, but with the causeway already inundated, twenty-three people sought refuge in a packinghouse. Floodwaters entered the building, forcing the occupants into the rafters. The building was eventually pushed into a nearby canal. Ten people drowned, but thirteen others survived by clinging to a barge or tree tops, while one woman tied herself to a telegraph pole. Others who survived were swept far away from the original sites of the building and the barge. On Ritta Island, a number of persons who had successfully climbed to the roof of their houses to escape floodwaters were struck by trees or received fatal bites from water moccasins.

In South Bay, nearly all houses were destroyed and several buildings were unroofed. At least 160 fatalities occurred in the city. The future first mayor of South Bay, Aubrey (a.k.a. "Orb" or "A.O.") Walker, along with his brother, Haughty D. Walker (a.k.a. "Haught"), survived the great hurricane of 1928 by gathering family members and joining a number of other South Bay citizens on a barge in the canal; this action allowed them to survive the flood waters that swept over South Bay and ultimately engulfed Okeelanta. Throughout the 1920s, Okeelanta had suffered several floods and muck fires. After being flooded severely during the 1928 hurricane, it was abandoned. Bean City was also destroyed during the hurricane, but it was eventually rebuilt by Arthur Wells. Sebring Farms was reduced to piles of rubber, with only four tall royal palm trees left standing. The hotel at Miami Locks was the only building to survive the storm. Ninety-nine people died in that town. In Chosen, only two people escaped a house that had sheltered nineteen people. Twenty other residents took refuge in a building which lost its roof during the storm, forcing the occupants to move into the restroom. The refugees were unaware that the house was moving until it collided with a railroad embankment.

Floodwaters persisted for several weeks, greatly impeding attempts to clean up the devastation. Burial services were quickly overwhelmed, and many of the bodies were placed into mass graves. Around 75% of the fatalities were migrant farm workers, making identification of both the dead and missing very difficult; as a result of this, the count of the dead is not very accurate. The Red Cross estimated the number of fatalities as 1,836, which was taken as the official count by the National Weather Service for many years. Older sources usually list 3,411 as the hurricane's total count of fatalities, including the Caribbean. However, in 2003, the U.S. death count was revised to "at least" 2,500, making the Okeechobee hurricane one of the deadliest natural disasters in United States history. A mass grave at the Port Mayaca Cemetery east of Port Mayaca contains the bodies of 1,600 victims of the hurricane.

Central and North Florida
In Fort Myers, property damage was slight, limited mostly to scores of small boats and fishing shacks along the waterfront. Nearly all cigar factories in Tampa were closed after wind and rain drove too much moisture into the buildings. Offshore, the fishing smack Wallace A. McDonnell was beached near Piney Point, though all of the crew survived. The Cuban schooner Isabel Alvado sank offshore Boca Grande. The crew, who were immigrants, were rescued by the Coast Guard and later deported. In Martin County, a bridge connecting Stuart and Palm City was severely damaged and closed to traffic as a result. A temporary ferry service across the St. Lucie River was established and operated until repairs to the bridge were complete in the summer of 1929. In Fort Pierce, most of the effects were confined to the waterfront areas. A warehouse, fish houses, docks, and a bridge across the Indian River were destroyed, while several other buildings were unroofed. Damage in the city totaled about $150,000.

In the interior areas of Central and North Florida, effects were mainly confined to agricultural losses, particularly citrus, though wind damage occurred to structures. Between Sebring and Lake Wales, 200 telephone poles were toppled. In Bartow, business building windows were shattered and signs were knocked down, while several roofs and chimneys also suffered damage. Winds gusting up to  lashed Lakeland. Many trees were uprooted and several buildings were impacted, including the hospital and a number of businesses. At Florida Southern College (FSC), the north side of the gymnasium collapsed while other buildings on campus were damaged to a lesser degree. The trees in the citrus grove surrounding FSC lost much of their fruit. Overall, Lakeland suffered about $50,000 in damage. In Orlando, damage to properties was described as slight. Strong winds up to  affected the Jacksonville area, resulting in minor damage at Jacksonville Beach.

Elsewhere
Outside Florida, damage from the hurricane elsewhere in the United States was minor. In Georgia, low-lying streets were flooded or washed out in the Savannah area. Additionally, winds downed trees and power lines. Heavy rainfall occurred from eastern Florida through coastal Georgia, the Carolinas, and southeast Virginia. The storm caused flooding in North Carolina and brought near-hurricane-force winds and a  storm surge to the Norfolk area. After the hurricane became extratropical, its wind field became very large. Atlantic City, New Jersey, recorded winds of  despite being far from the center.

Aftermath 

In the immediate aftermath of the storm, relief arrived from nearby areas such as Miami. Early on September 18, a train leaving Miami carried 20 doctors and 20 nurses to West Palm Beach. The Miami Red Cross Citizens Relief Committee, which was established to provide aid for victims of the storm, transported "hundreds of loaves of bread, gallons of milk, pounds of coffee and sugar, blankets, cots, and medical supplies." The first relief train was ridden by U.S. Senator Joseph T. Robinson, the Democratic vice presidential nominee during the election that year. At least 100 people were brought to Miami for medical treatment. In Lake Worth, 25 people were treated for various injuries at the Gulf Stream Hotel and the local fire station. Dr. W. A. Claxton, chief of the Miami Department of Public Welfare, requested antitoxin, typhoid serum, and at least 200 tetanus serums. There was also a request for 1,000 more cots in West Palm Beach and Kelsey City.

Racial issues 

In Florida, although the hurricane's destruction affected everything in its path, the death toll was by far the highest and the aftermath the worst in the economically poor areas in the low-lying ground near Lake Okeechobee, such as the towns of Belle Glade, Chosen, Pahokee, South Bay, and Bean City. Around 75% of the fatalities were among migrant farm workers, most of whom were black.

The black workers did most of the post-hurricane cleanup work. Reflecting racial and class discrimination, authorities reserved the few caskets available for burials for the bodies of whites. White victims received a formal burial service, although in a mass grave, at Woodlawn Cemetery in downtown West Palm Beach. This was the only mass gravesite to receive a timely memorial.

In contrast, the bodies of black victims were burned in funeral pyres or thrown into mass burial sites such as the ones in West Palm Beach and Port Mayaca.

Robert Hazard, a resident of West Palm Beach, established the Storm of '28 Memorial Park Coalition Inc. to fight for recognition of the black victims of the storm. In 2000, the West Palm Beach burial site was reacquired by the city of West Palm Beach and plans for construction of a memorial began. The site was listed on the U.S. National Register of Historic Places in 2002 and a state historical marker was added in 2003 during events to commemorate the 75th anniversary of the hurricane. 
 
African-American writer Zora Neale Hurston explored the effects of the hurricane on black migrant workers in her seminal 1937 novel, Their Eyes Were Watching God. This is her best-known work and it was included on TIME magazine's 2005 list of the '100 best English-language novels published since 1923'.

Improved building codes 
In the aftermath of the hurricane in coastal Florida, observers noted that well-constructed buildings with shutters had suffered practically no damage from winds that caused serious structural problems to lesser buildings. Buildings with well-constructed frames, and those made of steel, concrete, brick, or stone, were largely immune to winds. The use of shutters prevented damage to windows and the interior of the buildings. With the 1928 hurricane coming so soon after the 1926 Miami hurricane, where a similar pattern had been noticed, one lasting result of the 1928 storm was improved state and local building codes.

Flood control 

To prevent a recurrence of disasters like this one and the Great Miami Hurricane of 1926, the Florida State Legislature created the Okeechobee Flood Control District, which was authorized to cooperate with the U.S. Army Corps of Engineers in flood control undertakings. After a personal inspection of the area by President Herbert Hoover, the Corps of Engineers drafted a plan to provide for the construction of floodway channels, control gates, and major levees along the shores of Lake Okeechobee. A long-term system was designed for the purpose of flood control, water conservation, prevention of saltwater intrusion, and preservation of fish and wildlife populations. One of the solutions was the construction of the Herbert Hoover Dike.

In the early 21st century, there are concerns related to the dike's stability because studies have indicated long-term problems with "piping" and erosion. Leaks have been reported after several heavy rain events. Proposed solutions to the dike's problems have included the construction of a seepage berm on the landward side of the dike, with the first stage costing approximately $67 million (US$).

Name 

The storm was named the San Felipe II hurricane in Puerto Rico because the eye of the cyclone made landfall there on September 13, the Roman Catholic feast day of Saint Philip, father of Saint Eugenia of Rome. (King Philip II of Spain happened to die on this day.) It was named "Segundo", Spanish for "the Second", because of the weaker but destructive "San Felipe hurricane" that had struck Puerto Rico on that same day in 1876.

In Puerto Rico, since European colonization, storms and hurricanes were named after the name of the saint's day that the storm hit the island. For example, they named the Great Hurricane of 1780 as San Calixto, after Saint Callixtus, whose feast day is October 14; the 1867 San Narciso hurricane, the 1899 San Ciriaco hurricane, and the 1932 San Ciprian hurricane were also named after the saints' feast days on which they occurred (respectively, Saint Narcissus of Jerusalem on October 29, Saint Cyriacus on August 8, and Saint Cyprian on September 26).

In 1953, the United States Weather Bureau (now the National Weather Service) started naming hurricanes by human female names until 1978. That year both gender names began to be used after control over naming was relinquished to the World Meteorological Organization. It was not until 1960 that Puerto Rico stopped naming hurricanes after saints. Two cyclones have been given both women's and saint's names: Hurricane Betsy (Santa Clara, August 12, 1956) and Hurricane Donna (San Lorenzo, September 5, 1960).

See also 

 List of disasters in the United States by death toll
 Lists of Atlantic hurricanes
 List of Category 5 Atlantic hurricanes
 List of Florida hurricanes
 1899 San Ciriaco hurricane –  A destructive, long-lived Category 4 hurricane that took a similar path, devastating Puerto Rico and the Bahamas and later affecting Florida
 1926 Miami hurricane – A catastrophic Category 4 hurricane that caused numerous fatalities and widespread destruction
 Hurricane Irma (2017) – An extremely intense Category 5 hurricane that followed a similar path, causing widespread devastation
 Hurricane Maria (2017) – A Category 5 hurricane that was tenth most intense Atlantic hurricane on record and the second most intense hurricane to hit Puerto Rico

Notes

References

External links 

 Florida's Forgotten Hurricane 
 NOAA Okeechobee Hurricane Memorial
 Footage of storm damage
 National Weather Service Memorial Web page

O (1928)
Okeechobee Hurricane, 1928
San Felipe II Hurricane, 1928
Okeechobee Hurricane, 1928
Okeechobee Hurricane, 1928
1928 Okeechobee
Category 5 Atlantic hurricanes
Hurricanes in the Leeward Islands
Hurricanes in Guadeloupe
Hurricanes in Îles des Saintes
Hurricanes in Dominica
Hurricanes in Montserrat
Hurricanes in the United States Virgin Islands
Hurricanes in Puerto Rico
Hurricanes in the Turks and Caicos Islands
Hurricanes in the Bahamas
Hurricanes in Florida
O (1928)
1928 in the Caribbean
1928 natural disasters in the United States
1928 in the Bahamas
September 1928 events